A destructive tornado outbreak struck a wide swath of the Southern and Eastern United States as well as Canada on November 15 and 16, 1989. It produced at least 40 tornadoes and caused 30 deaths as a result of two deadly tornadoes. The most devastating event was the Huntsville, Alabama F4 tornado, which killed 21 on the afternoon of November 15. Nine more fatalities occurred at a single elementary school by an F1 tornado on November 16 in Newburgh, New York, although further survey revealed that this might have been a downburst instead. This outbreak also produced the most tornadoes in a single day in New Jersey. Several other significant tornadoes were reported across 15 states.

Meteorological Synopsis
Historically, tornadoes are relatively common in north Alabama, where Huntsville and Madison County are located. The region was affected by the April 3–4, 1974, Super Outbreak and records show that Madison County has had 25 tornadoes from 1950 through October 1989.

The Zone and Local Forecasts issued during the early morning, Tuesday, November 14, mentioned the possibility of severe thunderstorms on Wednesday. Subsequent forecasts and statements marked with increasing certainty the ominous nature of the events to come.

The National Severe Storms Forecast Center (NSSFC) issued a Public Severe Weather Outlook at 9:30 a.m. Wednesday and highlighted the unusually strong potential for severe thunderstorms and tornadoes over the Tennessee Valley. The Birmingham Forecast Office followed with a Special Weather Statement at 10:50 a.m. with the headline, "MAJOR SEVERE WEATHER THREAT POISED FOR ALABAMA AND NORTHWEST FLORIDA!".

A Tornado Watch was in effect for Madison and adjacent counties from 12:30 p.m. to 8:00 p.m. Soon after the issuance of the watch, emergency management officials, storm spotters and the NWS staff at Huntsville placed into effect a coordinated plan of action in accordance with established procedures. Beginning at 12:45 p.m., WSO Huntsville issued warnings for the west part of its county warning area as an intense squall line moved into northwest Alabama. Storm spotters reported large hail and intense straight-line wind associated with this squall line.

At the time the tornado struck Huntsville, a Severe Thunderstorm Warning was in effect for Madison County. That warning, issued at 4:13 p.m., was changed to a Tornado Warning at 4:35 p.m. based on a report relayed through the amateur radio spotter network of a tornado touchdown in the city. Critical weather information was disseminated over the NOAA Weather Wire Service (NWWS) and NWR and by many media outlets in Huntsville and adjacent areas providing the public with frequent weather updates on radio and "crawls" and live "cut-ins" on television. Links with spotter groups and emergency management and law enforcement officials worked well.

Confirmed tornadoes

November 15 event

November 16 event

Huntsville, Alabama

On the afternoon of Wednesday, November 15, 1989, at 4:35 p.m. (21:35 UTC), a tornado struck the southern portion of the city of Huntsville, cutting a swath of destruction from southwest toward the northeast through a business section and a heavily populated residential area. A total of 21 people died as a result of the tornado and 463 were injured. Eighteen people died in the immediate aftermath of the tornado, with two other people dying in early December and another passing away in January from injuries sustained in the tornado. Total damage estimates were placed around $100 million.

The tornado struck during the beginning of rush hour and touched down initially on Redstone Arsenal and then moved into a business area crossing two major north-south highways. Twelve of the 21 deaths (57 percent) occurred in automobiles, a striking similarity to the 1979 tornado that struck Wichita Falls, Texas. In the Huntsville tornado, most of those killed in cars were in the process of performing normal tasks as opposed to seeking automobiles for safety.

As the thunderstorm moved into the southwest corner of Madison County at 4:15 p.m. (21:15 UTC), the staff on duty at the WSO at Huntsville International Airport observed a wall cloud and rain-free base with the thunderstorm. The wall cloud showed no signs of rotation and dissipated shortly after being spotted. Shortly after this, between 4:20 and 4:30 p.m. (21:20–21:30 UTC), meteorologists working for NASA on Redstone Arsenal observed a wall cloud and rain-free base with the thunderstorm as it moved across the southern portion of the Arsenal. Around 4:25 p.m. (21:25 UTC), they observed rotation in the wall cloud.

According to information shared with the National Weather Service by Duane Stiegler with Dr. Ted Fujita's group from the University of Chicago, the initial point of damage occurred one mile south-southwest of Madkin Mountain on Redstone Arsenal near the intersection of Fowler Road and Mills Road at around 4:30 p.m. (21:30 UTC). Trees were downed and some roof gutters damaged. From eyewitness accounts of the wall cloud, circulating air may have reached the ground without a visible funnel.

The tornado continued on a northeast track passing northeast of Building 5250 on the Arsenal, with little damage done to that building. The storm then moved into a sparsely developed area, but it did cause about $1 million in damage to Huntsville's garbage-burning plant which was nearing the end of construction. At this point, the tornado began to cross the old Huntsville Airport and a large portion of the adjacent municipal golf course. It was here that the tornado struck the Huntsville Police Academy, generating one of the first reports of the existence of the tornado. Two officers were injured at the Police Academy.

From the golf course, the tornado entered a business-filled and heavily populated area of Huntsville. The tornado crossed Memorial Parkway (U.S. 231 and AL 53), a major north-south traffic artery. The tornado destroyed a number of shopping complexes, office buildings, churches, and much of the Waterford Square apartment complex as it slowly crossed Airport Road. It crossed Whitesburg Drive, another relatively major north-south highway. Nineteen of the twenty-one fatalities occurred in the area between the intersection of Airport Road and Memorial Parkway and the intersection of Airport Road and Whitesburg Drive. Eleven of the deaths occurred in automobiles, four in apartments, and four in commercial buildings.

From the intersection of Whitesburg Drive and Airport Road, the tornado moved up Garth Mountain, as it continued on a northeast course. This took the tornado into a heavily wooded section. As it crossed the top of Garth Mountain and moved down the east side, it struck Jones Valley Elementary School on Garth Road. Thirty-seven children, five teachers, and seven painters were in the school when the tornado struck, part of an extended daycare program conducted at the school. The lead teacher of the daycare program moved the children from the second floor of the school building into a small open area under the stairway on the first floor. This action, first suggested by the school principal as she left for the day, saved the lives of the children. One woman was killed in an automobile driving along Garth Road on the way to the school.

From the school, the tornado crossed Garth Road and moved across a portion of Jones Valley Subdivision, a development of well-constructed single family homes. The tornado severely damaged or destroyed a number of homes in the Jones Valley subdivision. It continued across Jones Valley moving before moving through a low gap between Round Top Mountain and Huntsville Mountain, passing just southeast of Monte Sano. The area from Huntsville Mountain to the end of the tornado path was mostly rural, with only scattered structures. However, the tornado continued to destroy or severely damage whatever structures it encountered.

The tornado topped the northern edge of Huntsville Mountain and moved down the east side, crossing U.S. 431. It traveled through a valley in the vicinity of Dug Hill before moving up and over Chestnut Knob. From Chestnut Knob, the tornado traversed the Flint River valley referred to as Salty Bottoms, crossing the Flint River and U.S. 72 one mile southeast of Brownsboro. It moved across the present-day location of Madison County High School (not built until 1999) and continued on an east-northeast track over Reed Mountain and Jasper Point to a small lake (known as Smith Lake) at the headwaters of the Killingsworth Cove Branch, a small creek which feeds into the Flint River. The tornado path ended at the southeast tip of the lake at 4:50 p.m. (21:50 UTC).

The damage path was generally about one-half mile wide; however, it reached nearly one mile in width in the Flint River/U.S. 72 area.

Damage estimates

A summary of damage from reports gathered by the Huntsville Times included: 
259 homes destroyed; 130 homes with major damage; 148 homes with minor to moderate damage 
80 businesses destroyed; 8 businesses damaged 
3 churches heavily damaged 
2 schools destroyed 
10 public buildings destroyed or heavily damaged 
$1.9 million in public utility damage

Monroe–Coldenham, New York

The East Coldenham Elementary School disaster was a deadly severe weather event that occurred on November 16, 1989 in Coldenham, New York, near the town of Newburgh, at approximately 12:30 p.m. EST (17:30 UTC), in which a suspected F1 tornado blew down a free-standing cafeteria wall, killing nine students and injuring 18 others. Though the event was officially recorded as a tornado, conclusive evidence from a survey by a team led by Ted Fujita and others indicates that it was a downburst instead.

Official records state that the F1 tornado touched down to the south in Monroe at approximately 12:31 p.m. As the storm struck the elementary school, approximately 120 children were eating lunch in the school cafeteria. One of the walls collapsed onto numerous children, killing seven instantly and injuring at least 20. Two of the injured later died in hospitals. When the tornado began to hit the school, the principal and other staff began trying to move students into the hallways in the immediate seconds before the collapse. Roughly 200 state and local police, fire fighters, and ambulance workers converged on the school to provide assistance, along with 25 ambulances, several fire rescue vans, and a helicopter. The search and rescue operations were completed by 7:15 p.m. EST (00:15 UTC) that evening.

The disaster received a tremendous amount of national and international media coverage at the time of the tragedy because most major news media outlets were at the United States Military Academy at West Point, New York, just ten miles away, to cover the awarding of the Sylvanus Thayer Award to former President Ronald Reagan, and accordingly were on site within minutes.

See also
List of North American tornadoes and tornado outbreaks
List of Storm Prediction Center high risk days
List of tornado-related deaths at schools
1995 Anderson Hills tornado

References

External links

F4 tornadoes by date
 ,1989-11-15
Tornadoes of 1989
Tornadoes in Alabama
Tornadoes in Arkansas
1989-11-16
Tornadoes in Tennessee
Tornadoes in Maryland
Tornadoes in New York (state)
Tornadoes in Kentucky
Tornadoes in Georgia (U.S. state)
Tornadoes in Ohio
Tornadoes in Mississippi
Tornadoes in Pennsylvania
Tornadoes in South Carolina
Tornadoes in Virginia
Tornadoes in West Virginia
1989-11-15
Derechos in the United States
1989 natural disasters in the United States
History of Huntsville, Alabama
Madison County, Alabama
November 1989 events in North America
1989 disasters in Canada